Robert Pötzelberger (9 June 1856, in Vienna – 2 August 1930, in Reichenau, Baden-Württemberg) was an Austrian painter, sculptor and lithographer.

Life 
Pötzelberger studied at the Academy of Fine Arts, Vienna between 1875 and 1879 under Leopold Carl Müller. After this education, he became a professor at the Academy of Fine Arts, Munich in 1880, staying until 1892; then, a professor at the Academy of Fine Arts, Karlsruhe until 1899; and then at the State Academy of Fine Arts Stuttgart until his retirement in 1926. His students included Friedrich Mißfeldt in Karlsruhe and  Willi Baumeister in Stuttgart. He was a founding member of the Vienna Secession.

Influenced by academic styles French impressionism, he created many historical works, but also looked to the natural world of South Germany and Austria for inspiration.

His son, Oswald Poetzelberger, was also a painter.

References

External links 

1856 births
1930 deaths
Austrian male sculptors
19th-century Austrian painters
19th-century German male artists
Austrian male painters
20th-century Austrian painters
19th-century sculptors
20th-century Austrian sculptors
Austrian lithographers
19th-century lithographers
20th-century lithographers
Members of the Vienna Secession
Artists from Vienna
Academy of Fine Arts Vienna alumni
Academic staff of the Academy of Fine Arts, Munich
Art Nouveau painters
Art Nouveau sculptors
20th-century Austrian male artists